The 2016 Billings Wolves season was the second season for the professional indoor football franchise and second in the Indoor Football League (IFL). One of ten teams that compete in the IFL for the 2016 season, the Wolves are members of the Intense Conference.

Led by head coach Chris Dixon, the Wolves play their home games at the Rimrock Auto Arena at MetraPark in Billings, Montana.

Schedule
Key:

Regular season
All start times are local time

Standings

Postseason

Roster

References

External links
Billings Wolves official website

Billings Wolves
Billings Wolves
Billings Wolves